James Paltridge (24 July 1891 – 14 June 1980) was an English professional footballer who played in the Football League for Chesterfield as a left half.

Personal life 
Paltridge served as a staff sergeant in the Royal Army Service Corps during the First World War.

Career statistics

Honours 
Chesterfield
 Midland League: 1919–20
 Derbyshire Senior Cup: 1920–21
 Chesterfield Hospital Charity Cup: 1920–21

References

1891 births
1980 deaths
Footballers from Plymouth, Devon
English footballers
Association football wing halves
English Football League players
British Army personnel of World War I
Royal Army Service Corps soldiers
Plymouth Argyle F.C. players
Chesterfield F.C. players
Alfreton Town F.C. players
Midland Football League players